Pachyprotasis is a genus of common sawflies in the family Tenthredinidae. There are at least 40 described species in Pachyprotasis.

Species
These 48 species belong to the genus Pachyprotasis:

 Pachyprotasis alboannulata Forsius, 1935 g
 Pachyprotasis antennata (Klug, 1817) g
 Pachyprotasis bicoloricornis Wei & Nie, 2002 g
 Pachyprotasis bilineata Zhong & Wei g
 Pachyprotasis chenghanhuai Wei & Zhong, 2006 g
 Pachyprotasis cinctulata Wei & Zhong, 2002 g
 Pachyprotasis coximaculata Zhong & Wei g
 Pachyprotasis coxipunctata Zhong & Wei g
 Pachyprotasis daochengensis Wei & Zhong, 2007 g
 Pachyprotasis eleviscutellis Wei & Nie, 1999 g
 Pachyprotasis emdeni Forsius, 1931 g
 Pachyprotasis erratica Smith, 1874 g
 Pachyprotasis flavocapita Wei & Zhong, 2002 g
 Pachyprotasis formosana Rohwer, 1916 g
 Pachyprotasis fulvocoxis Wei & Zhong, 2002 g
 Pachyprotasis fulvomaculata Wei & Zhong, 2002 g
 Pachyprotasis hengshani Zhong & Wei g
 Pachyprotasis indica g
 Pachyprotasis insularis Malaise, 1945 g
 Pachyprotasis longicornis Jakowlew, 1891 g
 Pachyprotasis maculopediba Wei & Zhong, 2002 g
 Pachyprotasis maculopleurita Wei & Zhong, 2002 g
 Pachyprotasis maculoscutellata Zhong & Wei g
 Pachyprotasis maculotergitis Zhu & Wei, 2008 g
 Pachyprotasis mai Zhong & Wei, 2013 g
 Pachyprotasis melanosoma Wei & Zhong, 2002 g
 Pachyprotasis micromaculata Wei, 1998 g
 Pachyprotasis nanlingia Wei, 2006 g
 Pachyprotasis nigroclypeata Wei, 1998 g
 Pachyprotasis nigronotata Kriechbaumer, 1874 g
 Pachyprotasis nitididorsata Wei & Zhong, 2002 g
 Pachyprotasis pailongensis Zhong & Wei g
 Pachyprotasis pallidistigma Malaise, 1931 g
 Pachyprotasis pleurochroma Malaise, 1945 g
 Pachyprotasis qilianica Zhong & Wei g
 Pachyprotasis qinlingica Wei, 1998 g
 Pachyprotasis rapae (Linnaeus, 1767) g b
 Pachyprotasis rubiapicilia Wei & Nie, 1999 g
 Pachyprotasis rubiginosa Wei & Nie, 1999 g
 Pachyprotasis rufocephala Wei, 2005 g
 Pachyprotasis rufocinctilia Wei, 1998 g
 Pachyprotasis shennongjiai Zhong & Wei g
 Pachyprotasis sichuanensis Zhong & Wei g
 Pachyprotasis simulans (Klug, 1817) g
 Pachyprotasis variegata (Fallén, 1808) g
 Pachyprotasis versicolor Cameron, 1876 g
 Pachyprotasis xibei Zhong & Wei, 2013 g
 Pachyprotasis zhoui Wei & Zhong, 2007 g

Data sources: i = ITIS, c = Catalogue of Life, g = GBIF, b = Bugguide.net

References

Further reading

External links

 

Tenthredinidae